Final Crisis: Rogues' Revenge is a three-issue 2008 mini-series produced by DC Comics. The series is a tie-in to Final Crisis, and is written by Geoff Johns and penciled by Scott Kolins. This reunites the creative team for the first time since their critically acclaimed run on The Flash (vol. 2) in 2001-2003.

Plot

After escaping the prison planet from Salvation Run, Captain Cold, Mirror Master, Weather Wizard and Heat Wave return to their hideout in Keystone, only to find the place has been invaded by a gang of youngsters led by the Trickster. After driving the squatters out, Captain Cold declares that after their violation of the number one rule ("Never kill a speedster"), the Rogues are finished and disbanded.

Meanwhile, in the Keystone Police District, detectives Chyre, Morillo and Ashley Zolomon are investigating Bart Allen's murder. As they discuss the Rogues, they are attacked by the Pied Piper, who steals the last will and testament of James Jesse. He is later seen in the ruined Rathaway mansion, studying the will, which consigns information on the Rogues, written in invisible ink.

In her home in Central City, Iris Allen is looking over photographs, tearfully remembering her late husband, when a disembodied voice calls out her name, and lightning strikes outside the window.

In his Keystone headquarters, Libra delivers a speech about the Religion of Crime to his Secret Society, when he is interrupted by Doctor Light, who has received a message from the Rogues. Captain Cold says "no" to the Society's offer, and Libra ominously reacts: "There's always a troublemaker in the bunch".

In the Flash Museum, Warden Wolfe and two guards are about to transfer the still-paralyzed Inertia to Iron Heights. Suddenly, a red lightning bolt strikes the villainous speedster and frees him. Again able to move, Inertia quickly kills the guards and runs to the home of Wally West, where he aims to kill the Flash's children. He is stopped by the very person who freed him: Zoom, who wants him to become the new Kid Flash.

When they learn of Inertia's escape, the Rogues decide to break their number one rule one last time before retirement, and to kill Inertia in revenge.

The Rogues begin their quest by visiting their tailor, Gambi, who is found beaten. A mirror similar to Mirror Master's is found and they receive a challenge from the "New Rogues" (first introduced in the Gotham Underground miniseries in which Penguin recruits them), who are counterparts of the current ones (including the absent Abra Kadabra, but not Trickster), to surrender to Libra or Captain Cold's father will be killed. Captain Cold accepts the challenge and threatens to kill his father himself. Mirror Master is able to trace the transmission. Each Rogue fights and kills his respective counterpart with Weather Wizard also killing Abra Kadabra's counterpart. Captain Cold confronts his father about his childhood abuse, but cannot bring himself to kill him. Instead, Captain Cold has Heatwave incinerate him and the bodies of the dead new Rogues.

Zoom continues to try to get Inertia to assume the Kid Flash identity. Inertia's speed is no longer powered by the Speed Force, but by Zoom and the timestream.

Libra decides to target another Rogue, Weather Wizard, with his abducted baby son. Libra seeks to have the Rogues on his side to stop any interference from the Flashes as their aid has been imperative in the previous Crises.

After the previous chapter, the Rogues hole up in Weather Wizard's brother's old lab.  While there, he mourns the death of his brother.  Mirror Master eventually locates Zoom & Inertia and the Rogues ambush them during a training session.  Piper enters the fray, immobilizing both sides and smashing in Mirror Master's teeth in retribution for the murder of his parents.

The fight is then interrupted by Libra who chastises Piper for his blasphemy in claiming he was a messenger from New Genesis and then gives Weather Wizard an ultimatum - join him or he will kill his son. Weather Wizard says that if he was capable of killing his own brother, there's no way he would not kill his son.  Libra calls his bluff, but before this could be resolved Inertia kills the child and proclaims himself Kid Zoom.

Zoom is outraged by this, but Kid Zoom turns on him, taking all of Zoom's powers and changing him back into Hunter Zolomon. He then proceeds to attack Libra, but the Rogues and Piper rally and attack Kid Zoom all at once, killing him.  Libra then tells them that after killing two speedsters (Kid Zoom and Bart), they are ready to take on the returned Barry Allen in the name of Darkseid. The Rogues are stunned to learn of Barry's return, but turn down Libra, saying they want no part in what is sure to be Libra's defeat; as they leave, Libra shouts at them that evil will win the fight.

Afterwards, Piper turns himself in to the police and the Rogues' deliver Kid Zoom's corpse to the police with a note to the Flash that they were now even. Back at their hideout, Captain Cold scoffs at the idea of evil winning, stating he did not believe in true evil, merely different shades of gray. He then decides to put off retirement claiming that the game is back on because of Barry Allen, to which all the other Rogues agree. The issue ends with the foreshadowing of 2009's The Flash: Rebirth.

Reception
Dan Phillips of IGN praised the series, giving the issues a 7.9, 9.3, and 9.2 respectively. While originally calling the first issue somewhat of a "letdown", Phillips would call the series a "homerun" by the third issue.

Comic Book Resources gave the last issue three-and-half stars out of five, claiming the series "is a worthy successor to his [Geoff Johns] best "Flash" stories of yesteryear", but was critical to Scott Kolins' art, saying it "looks sloppy in individual panels".

Collected editions
The series will be collected into a single volume:

Final Crisis: Rogues' Revenge (collects Final Crisis: Rogues' Revenge #1–3 and The Flash vol. 2 #182 and #197, 144 pages, hardcover, July 2009, ; paperback, July 2010)

Notes

References

2008 comics debuts
2008 comics endings
Comics by Geoff Johns